Abdul Rahim Sebah (born 27 December 1991) is a Ghanaian professional footballer who played as a defender.

External links
 
 
 

1991 births
Living people
Ghanaian footballers
Association football defenders
Süper Lig players
Belgian Pro League players
R. Charleroi S.C. players
Kasımpaşa S.K. footballers
Edirnespor footballers
Ghanaian expatriate footballers
Ghanaian expatriate sportspeople in Belgium
Expatriate footballers in Belgium
Ghanaian expatriate sportspeople in Turkey
Expatriate footballers in Turkey